Wilmslow is a town and civil parish in Cheshire East, England.  The area, including the parishes of Handforth and Styal, contains 81 buildings that are recorded in the National Heritage List for England as designated listed buildings.  Of these, one is listed at Grade I, the highest grade, eight are listed at Grade II*, the middle grade, and the others are at Grade II.  The town has grown from a village to encompass some of the surrounding settlements to become a dormitory town for Manchester.  Buildings listed within the town include the church and associated structures, a bridge, and former weavers' cottages.  Also in the area is the village of Styal that was developed to house the workers at Quarry Bank Mill.  The mill, associated structures, and many of the cottages in the village are listed.  Elsewhere the listed buildings include country houses and associated structures, farms and farm buildings, bridges, public houses, chapels, and a viaduct.

Key

Buildings

See also

Listed buildings in Ringway
Listed buildings in Altrincham
Listed buildings in Manchester-M22
Listed buildings in Stockport
Listed buildings in Mottram St Andrew
Listed buildings in Alderley Edge
Listed buildings in Chorley
Listed buildings in Mobberley

References
Citations

Sources

Listed buildings in the Borough of Cheshire East
Lists of listed buildings in Cheshire
Listed